The Azanian Confederation of Trade Unions (AZACTU) was a national trade union federation in South Africa.

The federation was established in 1984, with eight affiliates, representing a total of 75,000 black workers.  These formerly independent affiliates had been active in numerous strikes in 1983 and 1984.  The federation was independent of the Azanian People's Organisation, although that party had helped set up several of the affiliates.

In 1985, the federation began discussing a merger with the Council of Unions of South Africa.  Although initial discussions fell through, on 5 October 1986 a merger was completed, forming the National Council of Trade Unions.

Affiliates

References

National trade union centres of South Africa
Trade unions established in 1984
Trade unions disestablished in 1986